The Battle of Nomae was a battle fought in 450 BCE between a united Sicel army under the command of Ducetius and the Greeks of Syracuse. Ducetius was defeated and his Sicel state broke down soon after.

The Sicels were one of the original inhabitants of Sicily but their territory was slowly shrinking due to the expansion of the Greek colonies on the island, mainly Syracuse and Akragas. However, in the 450's BCE they had grown in power under a leader named Ducetius, who had united the Sicel territory under his rule. He was originally an ally of Syracuse, helping them in a war against Catana. However, as he grew in power, and also began to expand into Greek territory, Syracuse became concerned. When Ducetius attacked the other major Sicilian Greek power Akragas, the city asked Syracuse for help and Syracuse agreed. The united forces of the two cities advanced towards Ducetius's army, which was besieging the stronghold Motyon (Motya) and met him in battle there, however they were defeated by the Sicels, who took Motyon.

The Greeks regrouped over winter and launched a second assault in the spring of 450. Akragas moved to retake Motyon while Syracuse, who were probably fielding their full remaining army of around 4,500 to 5,500 troops, moved to engage Ducetius. The forces met at Nomae and the Greeks gained a victory this time.

After the battle Ducetius was deserted by his troops and his kingdom broke apart. He surrendered himself to Syracuse, who allowed him to go into exile in Corinth. The Sicels would never pose a major threat to the Greeks in Sicily again. Syracuse and Akragas would not remain allies for long and soon began disputing control over Sicily. Ducetius would return in 446 BCE and founded the city of Kale Akte, which annoyed Akragas who used it as an excuse to go to war with Syracuse for not executing Ducetius. This would result in the Battle of the Himera River (446 BC) in which Syracuse won, becoming the dominant power in Sicily until the Second Sicilian War against Carthage.

References

Nomae
Nomae
450 BC